Events from the year 1897 in Canada.

Incumbents

Crown 
 Monarch – Victoria

Federal government 
 Governor General – John Hamilton-Gordon 
 Prime Minister – Wilfrid Laurier
 Chief Justice – Samuel Henry Strong (Ontario)
 Parliament – 8th

Provincial governments

Lieutenant governors 
Lieutenant Governor of British Columbia – Edgar Dewdney (until November 18) then Thomas Robert McInnes
Lieutenant Governor of Manitoba – James Colebrooke Patterson
Lieutenant Governor of New Brunswick – Jabez Bunting Snowball 
Lieutenant Governor of Nova Scotia – Malachy Bowes Daly   
Lieutenant Governor of Ontario – Casimir Gzowski (acting) (until November 18) then Oliver Mowat 
Lieutenant Governor of Prince Edward Island – George William Howlan
Lieutenant Governor of Quebec – Joseph-Adolphe Chapleau

Premiers 
Premier of British Columbia – John Herbert Turner 
Premier of Manitoba – Thomas Greenway 
Premier of New Brunswick – James Mitchell (until October 29) then Henry Emmerson 
Premier of Nova Scotia – George Henry Murray 
Premier of Ontario – Arthur Sturgis Hardy    
Premier of Prince Edward Island – Frederick Peters (until October 1) then Alexander Warburton
Premier of Quebec – Edmund James Flynn (until May 24) then Félix-Gabriel Marchand

Territorial governments

Commissioners 
 Commissioner of Yukon – James Morrow Walsh (from August 17)

Lieutenant governors 
 Lieutenant Governor of Keewatin – James Colebrooke Patterson
 Lieutenant Governor of the North-West Territories – Charles Herbert Mackintosh

Premiers 
 Chairman of the executive committee of the North-West Territories then Premier of North-West Territories – Frederick Haultain (from October 7)

Events 

 January 29 – The Victorian Order of Nurses is founded in Ottawa
 February 2 – Clara Brett Martin becomes the first woman to practise law in Ontario
 February 19 – World's first Women's Institute founded in Stoney Creek, Ontario
 May 24 – Félix-Gabriel Marchand becomes premier of Quebec, replacing Edmund Flynn
 May 24 – Lion of Belfort (Montreal) unveiled
 June 20 – Diamond Jubilee of Victoria's accession as Queen
 September 6 – The federal government gives the CPR a grant to allow it to reduce freight rates through Crowsnest Pass
 October – A.B. Warburton becomes Premier of Prince Edward Island
 October 7 – Responsible government is introduced in the North-West Territories: Frederick Haultain becomes the first premier
 October 29 – Henry Emmerson becomes premier of New Brunswick, replacing James Mitchell

Full date unknown 

 Klondike Gold Rush rages in the Yukon
 Lord Grey proposes that Canada create a navy to protect its west coast; Prime Minister Laurier does not act on the recommendation
 1897–1912 – 961,000 people enter Canada from the British Isles, 594,000 from Europe and 784,000 from the United States.
 The first Canadian movie, Ten Years in Manitoba

Births 

 January 23 – William Stephenson, soldier, airman, businessperson, inventor and spymaster (d.1989)
 January 27 – Charles Stephen Booth, politician and barrister
 March 9 – Sidney Earle Smith, academic and 7th President of the University of Toronto (d.1959)
 April 23 – Lester B. Pearson, politician, 14th Prime Minister of Canada, diplomat and 1957 Nobel Peace Prize recipient (d.1972)
 September 23 – Walter Pidgeon, actor (d.1984)
 September 29 – Graham Towers, first Governor of the Bank of Canada (d.1975)
 November 30 – William Murdoch Buchanan, politician (d.1966)
 December 7 – Gordon Graydon, politician (d.1953)

Deaths 

 January 2 – Thomas McGreevy, politician and contractor (b.1825)
 February 27 – James Austin, businessman (b.1813)
 July 4 – Amor De Cosmos, journalist, politician and 2nd Premier of British Columbia (b.1825)
 September 19 – Frederick Cope, 3rd Mayor of Vancouver (b.1860)
 October 21 – Philip Francis Little, 1st Premier of Newfoundland of the colonial (b.1824)
 December 14 – Robert Simpson, businessman and founder of Simpsons (b.1834)
 December 15 – James Mitchell, politician and 7th Premier of New Brunswick (b.1843)
 December 31 – David Oppenheimer, entrepreneur and 2nd Mayor of Vancouver (b.1832)

Historical documents

Cree leader Almighty Voice pursued and killed by North-West Mounted Police in Saskatchewan

Annual report of Indian agent for Kootenay Agency in British Columbia

Anglican missionary conducts church services on his dogsled trip around northwest Alberta

Kipling's poem "Our Lady of the Snows" acknowledges Canada's solidarity but independence in its relations with Britain (Note: "white man" used)

Editorial praises founding of Victorian Order of Nurses

Illustration of fully outfitted Klondike Gold Rush adventurer, with price of each garment and do/don't lists

Lack of food and other boomtown problems discourage some Dawson City residents

British railway labourers in western Canada treated as slaves before escaping

"A love affair this summer" - Diary writer records declaration of love from another woman visiting Camp Viamede, Stony Lake, Ontario

Newspaper map of bicycling routes in and around Victoria, B.C. includes hotels and hills

Cycling map of Montreal distinguishes roads and "good roads"

References
  

 
Years of the 19th century in Canada
Canada
1897 in North America